The Fresno State Bulldogs men's basketball statistical leaders are individual statistical leaders of the Fresno State Bulldogs men's basketball program in various categories, including points, assists, blocks, rebounds, and steals. Within those areas, the lists identify single-game, single-season, and career leaders. The Bulldogs represent Fresno State University in the NCAA's Mountain West Conference.

Fresno State began competing in intercollegiate basketball in 1955.

The NCAA did not officially record assists as a stat until the 1983–84 season, and blocks and steals until the 1985–86 season, but Fresno State's record books includes players in these stats before these seasons. These lists are updated through the end of the 2021–22 season.

Scoring

Rebounds

Assists

Steals

Blocks

References

Fresno State Bulldogs men's basketball leaders

Lists of college basketball statistical leaders by team